The 2015 Reinert Open was a professional tennis tournament played on outdoor clay courts. It was the eighth edition of the tournament and part of the 2015 ITF Women's Circuit, offering a total of $50,000 in prize money. It took place in Versmold, Germany, on 6–12 June 2015.

Singles main draw entrants

Seeds 

 1 Rankings as of 29 June 2015

Other entrants 
The following players received wildcards into the singles main draw:
  Katharina Gerlach
  Katharina Hobgarski
  Johanna Larsson
  Carina Witthöft

The following players received entry from the qualifying draw:
  Valentini Grammatikopoulou
  Gabriela Pantůčková
  Tamara Korpatsch
  Petra Rohanová

The following player received entry as a lucky loser:
  Tereza Malíková

The following player received entry by a junior exempt:
  Iryna Shymanovich

Champions

Singles

 Carina Witthöft def.  Johanna Larsson 6–3, 6–3

Doubles

 Eva Hrdinová /  Shahar Pe'er def.  Alona Fomina /  Sofiya Kovalets 6–1, 6–3

External links 
 2015 Reinert Open at ITFtennis.com
 Official website 

2015 ITF Women's Circuit
Reinert Open
2015 in German tennis
2015 in German women's sport